William James "Jim" Kennedy is a British geologist.

Jim Kennedy studied at the University of London.

Kennedy was a Fellow of Wolfson College, Oxford and Professor of Earth Sciences at the University of Oxford. He was curator of the Geological Collections at the Oxford University Museum of Natural History.

Kennedy was awarded the Prestwich Medal by the Geological Society of London in 1990, the Neville George Medal of the Geological Society of Glasgow in 1992 and the Gold Medal for Zoology of the Linnean Society in 2002, and is the first recipient of the Palaeontographical Medal awarded by the Palaeontographical Society in 2014.

He was the Acting President of Wolfson College during 1993–94 between more permanent presidents at the college.

On 1 October 2003, Kennedy was appointed the Director of the Oxford University Museum of Natural History. He is also Professor of Natural History.
His research interests include the geology and palaeontology of the Cretaceous Period and he has a particular interest in ammonites.

Kennedy is an Emeritus Fellow at Kellogg College, Oxford.

References 

Year of birth missing (living people)
Living people
Alumni of the University of London
British curators
British geologists
Directors of museums in the United Kingdom
Fellows of Wolfson College, Oxford
Presidents of Wolfson College, Oxford
Academics of the University of Oxford